She's My Baby may refer to:

Songs
 "She's My Baby" (Traveling Wilburys song),  1990
 "She's My Baby" (Wings song), 1976
 "She's My Baby", a song by Faithless from Sunday 8PM
 "She's My Baby", a song by Fats Domino
 "She's My Baby", a song by Johnny O'Keefe
 "She's My Baby", a song by Mazzy Star from So Tonight That I Might See
 "She's My Baby", a song by the Rocket Summer from Calendar Days
 "She's My Baby (And She's Outta Control)", a song from the soundtrack to Fast Times at Ridgemont High

Other
 She's My Baby (film), a 1927 American silent comedy film
 She's My Baby, a 1928 musical by Rodgers and Hart